North Mesopotamian Arabic, also known as Moslawi (meaning 'of Mosul'), Mesopotamian Qeltu Arabic, or Syro-Mesopotamian Arabic, is one of the two main varieties of Mesopotamian Arabic, together with Gilit Mesopotamian Arabic.

Relationship to Gilit Mesopotamian

Dialects 

The peripheral Anatolian Arabic varieties in Siirt, Muş and Batman are quite divergent.

Cypriot Arabic shares a number of common features with North Mesopotamian Arabic, and one of its pre-Cypriot medieval antecedents has been deduced as belonging to this dialect area. However, its current form is a hybrid of different varieties and languages, including Levantine Arabic and Greek.

Aramaic substrate

References

North Mesopotamian Arabic